Elections to North Tyneside Metropolitan Council took place on 4 May 2006 on the same day as other local council elections in England.

North Tyneside Council is elected "in thirds" which means one councillor from each three-member ward is elected each year for the first three years with a fourth year when the mayoral election takes place.

Battle Hill

Benton

A further by-election was held on 28 September 2006. Details of this can be found here.

Camperdown

Chirton

Collingwood

Cullercoats

Howdon

Killingworth

Longbenton

Monkseaton North

Monkseaton South

Northumberland

Preston

Riverside

St Mary's

Tynemouth

Valley

Wallsend

Weetslade

Whitley Bay

2006 English local elections
2006
21st century in Tyne and Wear